Aventine may refer to: 

Aventine (album), album by Danish singer-songwriter Agnes Obel. 
"Aventine" (song), title track from album above

See also
Aventine Hall, historic home located at Luray, Page County, Virginia
Aventine Hill, one of the seven hills on which ancient Rome was built
Aventine Renewable Energy, bioethanol and biodiesel company based in Pekin, Illinois
Aventine Secession (494 BC)
Aventine Secession (20th century)
Aventine Triad, modern term for the joint cult of the Roman deities Ceres, Liber and Libera
Mount Aventine, farm complex and national historic district located along the Potomac River in Bryans Road, Charles County, Maryland.
Santa Sabina, or Basilica of Saint Sabina, historical church on the Aventine Hill in Rome, Italy